There have been two baronetcies created for persons with the surname East, one in the Baronetage of Great Britain and one in the Baronetage of the United Kingdom.

The East Baronetcy of Hall Place, Maidenhead, Berkshire was created in the Baronetage of Great Britain for William East on 5 June 1766 who was High Sheriff of Berkshire the same year. The second baronet, Sir Gilbert East, was appointed High Sheriff of Berkshire in 1822.

The East Baronetcy of Calcutta was created in the Baronetage of the United Kingdom for Edward Hyde East on 25 April 1823. He was MP for Great Bedwyn (1792–1796) and Winchester (1823–1831). His son, the second baronet Sir James Buller East, was also MP for Winchester (1831–1832) and (1835–1864).

East baronets, of Hall Place (GB 1766)

 Sir William East, 1st Baronet of Hall Place, Maidenhead (1738–1819)
 Sir Gilbert East, 2nd Baronet of Hall Place, Maidenhead (1764–1828) Extinct on his death

East baronets of Calcutta, India (UK 1823)

 Sir Edward Hyde East, 1st Baronet (1764–1847)
 Sir James Buller East, 2nd Baronet (1789–1878), extinct on his death

See also
For the Clayton-East and Clayton-East-Clayton baronets of Marden Park, see Clayton baronets

References
 
 

Extinct baronetcies in the Baronetage of Great Britain
Extinct baronetcies in the Baronetage of the United Kingdom